Maria Helena Moraes Scripilliti (born 1930/1931) is a Brazilian businesswoman, co-owner of the privately held Votorantim Group.

Early life
She was born Maria Helena de Moraes in Brazil, one of two children of the late Antônio Ermírio de Moraes.

Career
Following the death of her father in 2014, she and her brother inherited control of Votorantim Group, one of Brazil's largest privately held companies.

According to Forbes, she has an estimated net worth of $1.7 billion as of September 2020.

Personal life
She was married to the late Clovis Scripilliti, who expanded Votorantim Group in northeast Brazil during the 1960s and 1970s. They had four children, including Clovis Ermírio de Moraes Scripilliti who is vice chairman of Votorantim Group.

References

Living people
Businesspeople from São Paulo
Brazilian billionaires
Female billionaires
20th-century Brazilian businesswomen
20th-century Brazilian businesspeople
1930s births
Date of birth uncertain
21st-century Brazilian businesswomen
21st-century Brazilian businesspeople